Sirakoro may refer to one of the following settlements in Africa:

Sirakoro, Mangodara, Burkina Faso
Sirakoro, Ouo, Burkina Faso
Sirakoro, Mali